"Many Rivers to Cross" is a song written and recorded in 1969 by Jimmy Cliff. It has since been recorded by many musicians, including Harry Nilsson, John Lennon, Joe Cocker, Percy Sledge,  Little Milton, Desmond Dekker, UB40, Cher, The Brand New Heavies, Eric Burdon & The Animals, The Walker Brothers, Marcia Hines, Toni Childs, Oleta Adams, Linda Ronstadt, Annie Lennox, Bryan Adams, Chris Pierce, Arthur Lee and Jimmy Barnes. It was also performed in the Caribbean by Alison Hinds of Barbados and Tessanne Chin of Jamaica, the same place Jimmy Cliff himself is from.

Background
Cliff was aged 21 when he wrote and recorded the song in 1969. He stated he wrote the song due to the trouble he was having making it as a successful musical artist after originally finding success in his home of Jamaica, beginning at age 14, before moving to the United Kingdom. He commented, "When I came to the UK, I was still in my teens. I came full of vigor: I'm going to make it, I’m going to be up there with the Beatles and the Stones. And it wasn’t really going like that, I was touring clubs, not breaking through. I was struggling, with work, life, my identity, I couldn't find my place; frustration fueled the song."  

Regarding the line, "Wandering I am lost, as I travel along the White Cliffs of Dover," Cliff stated, "...that came from the number of times I crossed the channel to the continent. Most of the time it was France but sometimes it was Germany. It was a very frustrating time. I came to England with very big hopes and I saw my hopes fading. And that song came out of that experience."

Song information
Cliff stated he was working on his second album for Island Records, but held the song back because he did not think a ballad would be appropriate. He waited until he came to New York to mix the record and add overdubs and backing vocals. He was walking from his residence to the studio, which took 15 minutes, and finished composing the song in his head.  On the last day of the session, as the union backing musicians were preparing to leave, Cliff asked if he could play a song idea he had. He said, "I started singing, the band came in, and that was it. Once. That was it. And then Chris said, ‘OK, let's put this one in to fill out the album.’"

This is one of the few Cliff tracks to use an organ, which helps to supplement the gospel feel provided by the backing vocalists. He released the song, with production work by Leslie Kong, on his 1969 album, Jimmy Cliff. It was also released on the 1972 soundtrack album for the film The Harder They Come, in which Cliff also starred. Rolling Stone ranked it No. 325 on their list of the 500 Greatest Songs of All Time.

The song is featured in the 2013 film Rush, and the TV shows Wilfred, Daredevil and Falling Skies.

Charts

UB40 version

"'Many Rivers to Cross" is the third single by the reggae group UB40 from the album Labour of Love. This single peaked at the number 16 on the UK Singles Chart and the number 48 in New Zealand.

Track listing and formats 
UK 7" single
"Many Rivers To Cross" – 3:48
"Food For Thought " – 4:40

7" single (Spain)
"Many Rivers To Cross" – 3:48
"Food For Thought " – 4:40

UK 12" maxi-single
A1."Many Rivers To Cross" (Full Length Version) – 4:35
A2."Food For Thought " – 4:40
B2."Johnny Too Bad" (Unexpurgated Version - Not On Labour Of Love) – 5:28

Germany 12" single
A1."Many Rivers To Cross" (Full Length Version)  – 4:27
A2."Food For Thought " – 4:39
B2."Johnny Too Bad" – 5:29

Personnel 
UB40
James Brown – drums, syncussion
Ali Campbell – vocals, guitar
Robin Campbell – guitar, vocals
Earl Falconer – bass
Norman Hassan – percussion, vocals
Brian Travers – saxophones
Michael Virtue – keyboards
Astro – toasting, rhyming, percussion

Additional personnel
Mo Birch – vocals
Jaki Graham – vocals
Jackie Mittoo – additional keyboards
Ruby Turner – vocals

Charts

Cher version

Track listing
European 7" and cassette single
"Many Rivers to Cross" – 4:09
"Who You Gonna Believe" – 4:42

European CD single
"Many Rivers to Cross" – 4:09
"Who You Gonna Believe" – 4:42
"All Because of You" – 3:28
"Perfection" – 4:29

UK second live cover versions CD single
"Many Rivers to Cross" – 4:09
"Tougher Than the Rest" – 4:43
"Fire Down Below" – 4:28
"Takin' It to the Streets" – 4:05

Charts

Annie Lennox version

Charts

References

External links
Jimmy Cliff official website
Jimmy Cliff discography at Discogs

1969 songs
1969 singles
1983 singles
1993 singles
2008 singles
Cher songs
Desmond Dekker songs
Geffen Records singles
Harry Nilsson songs
Jimmy Cliff songs
Joe Cocker songs
Linda Ronstadt songs
Reggae songs
Song recordings produced by Leslie Kong
Trojan Records singles
The Animals songs
UB40 songs
Songs written by Jimmy Cliff
Gospel songs
Songs about loneliness
Song recordings produced by John Lennon